Kashmera Shah (born 2 December 1972) is an Indian actress. She has appeared in numerous Hindi and Marathi films. She was also a contestant on the reality shows Bigg Boss 1, Nach Baliye 3 and Fear Factor: Khatron Ke Khiladi 4.

Filmography

Films

Television

Special appearances

References

External links

Kashmera Shah at StarBio

Living people
Actresses in Hindi cinema
Participants in Indian reality television series
Reality dancing competition winners
Actresses from Mumbai
Indian film actresses
University of Mumbai alumni
Fear Factor: Khatron Ke Khiladi participants
Bigg Boss (Hindi TV series) contestants
1972 births
Actresses in Malayalam cinema